Bašin  is a village in the municipality of Smederevska Palanka, Serbia. According to the 2011 census, the village has a population of 444 people.

External links 

 Kultura iz Pariza, a u Šumadiji

References

Populated places in Podunavlje District